Places I Have Never Been is an album by the American musician Willie Nile, released in 1991. It was Nile's first album in 10 years, as legal and personal issues prevented him from putting out music. Nile supported the album with a North American tour.

Production
The album was produced by Tom "T-Bone" Wolk and Stewart Lerman; Nile chose them after Rick Chertoff became unavailable. It was Nile's intention to write an optimistic record.

Richard Thompson and Roger McGuinn were among the guitar players who contributed to the album. Suzzy Roche, Terre Roche, and Loudon Wainwright III sang on "That's Enough for Me". Members of the Hooters also contributed to Places I Have Never Been.

Critical reception

The Austin American-Statesman wrote that "the nasal vocals, chiming guitars and anthemic scope of the material offer a hint of Tom Petty, a little Bruce Springsteen and a whole lot of Byrds." The Atlanta Journal-Constitution opined that "Nile's lyrics, as they were on his first two records, are still his strong suit." 

The Washington Post deemed the album "a half-dozen sharp but not overly slick grabbers" and "a modest pleasure—even if it too is the sort of album that includes a reprise of its opening song." The Vancouver Sun called it "pretty nifty ... adult rock and roll." The Toronto Sun considered it to be "a jangly and surprisingly upbeat collection of folk-rock."

Track listing

Personnel
Musicians
Willie Nile – lead & background vocals, electric, 12 string,  & acoustic guitars, keyboard and piano
Stewart Lerman - electric & acoustic guitars, 6 & 12 string guitars, maracas
T-Bone Wolk - bass, acoustic guitar, keyboard, piano, percussion
Mickey Curry - drums, tambourine, percussion, background vocals
Peter Wood - keyboard, piano
Larry Campbell - fiddle
Roger McGuinn - guitar, 12 string guitar, background vocals
Mark Johnson - background vocals
James Cobb - background vocals
Robbie McIntosh - electric guitar
William Wittmann - acoustic guitar, background vocals, keyboard
Paul "Wix" Wickens - Hammond organ
Richard Thompson - lead electric guitar, background vocals
Eric Bazilian - mandolin, background vocals
Rob Hyman - accordion
Richard Kennedy - lead acoustic guitar
Luke Noonan - piano, background vocals
Terre Roche - background vocals
Suzzy Roche - background vocals
Loudon Wainwright III - background vocals
Bobby Noonan - background vocals
Mary Noonan - background vocals
JoJo Noonan - background vocals
Jennifer Krause - background vocals
Anthony Acquilato - background vocals
Kelly Moore - background vocals
Mel Papaterpos - background vocals
Production and additional personnel
Produced by Tom "T-Bone" Wolk  and Stewart Lerman
Executive producer: Rick Chertoff 
Mixing and additional recording Produced by William Wittmann 
Recorded and mixed by John Agnello
Recorded at 321 Studios, The Hit Factory, Messina Music (New York City), Home Base Studios, Studio 4 (Philadelphia) 
Mixed at Messina Music
Additional engineering: Tim Leitner, Ted Trewhella
Assistant engineers: Ted Trewhella, Tom Cadley, Lance Neal, Joe Bartoldus, Phil Nicolo
Mastered by George Marino at Sterling Sound (New York City) 
 Art direction by Tony Sellari
 Cover photography by Lou Salvatori

References 

Willie Nile albums
1991 albums
Columbia Records albums
Albums produced by Stewart Lerman